The Imperial Seal of the Mongols is a seal (tamgha) that was used by the Mongols. The imperial seals, bearing inscriptions in Mongolian script or other scripts, were used in the Mongol Empire, the Yuan dynasty and the Northern Yuan dynasty, among others.

According to Plano Carpini, the Russian handicraftsman, Kozma, made a seal for Güyük Khan. This seal might have been a seal used to stamp the letter to Pope Innocent IV.

The Polish scholar, Cyrill Koralevsky, shot a photo of the seal in 1920. The prominent French Mongolist, P. Pelliot, translated the Mongolian scripts on the seal later. However, the Mongolists believe that Kozma made only one of the imperial seals and a seal on the letter was Genghis Khan's, which was inherited by his successors. 

During the Yuan dynasty, which ruled the whole of China proper, there were several seals. Biligtü Khan (Emperor Zhaozong) of the Northern Yuan dynasty had an imperial seal with the script "Great Yuan". In the 16th century, the Mongols used a square-shaped seal. When the Northern Yuan dynasty collapsed in 1635, Ejei Khan gave one of those seals to the Later Jin dynasty, which later became the Qing dynasty in 1636.

Bogd Jivzundamba, ruler of the Bogd Khaganate had a tamgha (seal) with the inscription "Holiness – Bogd Khan who holds religion and authority" in the 20th century.

See also 
 Heirloom Seal of the Realm
 National seals of the Republic of China
 Seal of the People's Government of the People's Republic of China
 Seal of South Korea
 National seals of Japan
 Imperial Seal of Manchukuo
 Seals of the Nguyễn dynasty

References 

  

Mongol Empire
Yuan dynasty
Northern Yuan dynasty
History of Mongolia
Chinese heraldry
Mongolia
National symbols of Mongolia